Crassispira bottae is a species of sea snail, a marine gastropod mollusk in the family Pseudomelatomidae.

ITIS considers this species a synonym of Crassispira incrassata (Sowerby I, 1834)  McLean confirmed that Pleurotoma bottae was a synonym of Crassispira incrassata  The radula and the morphology was studied by Kantor et al. in 1997

Description
The length of the shell varies between 35 mm and 50 mm.

The ponderous shell is dark chestnut or chocolate. The shell shows a slight shoulder-angle, above which the whorls are slightly concave to a sutural band. Below the shoulder the shell shows close rude
longitudinal ribs, sometimes decussated into nodules by the raised revolving lines. Towards the base of the body whorl the latter remain prominent, whilst the former have vanished.

Distribution
This marine species occurs off the Sea of Cortez, Western Mexico to Ecuador

References

 Kiener, L.-C., 1839 Genre Pleurotome (Pleurotoma, Lam). Volume 5. In: Species général et iconographie des coquilles vivantes

External links
 
 
 Denver museum of nature & science: Crassispira bottae

bottae
Gastropods described in 1839